Soissons Cathedral (French: Cathédrale Saint-Gervais-et-Saint-Protais) is a Gothic basilica church in Soissons, France. It is the seat of the Bishop of Soissons, Laon, and Saint-Quentin. The construction of the south transept was begun about 1177, and the lowest courses of the choir in 1182.

History
The choir, with its original three-storey elevation and extremely tall clerestory, was completed in 1211. This was earlier than Chartres, on which the design was supposed to have been based. Work then continued into the nave until the late 13th century.

The single western tower dates from the mid-13th century and is an imitation of those of Notre-Dame de Paris, which it equals in height. The tower was restored after it and part of the nave were severely damaged in World War I. A matching tower on the other side of the façade was originally planned, but never built.

Description
The graceful southern transept, the oldest portion of the whole edifice, terminates in an apse. Unlike the rest of the building, it is divided inside into four (rather than three) levels.

The choir end of the cathedral contains stained glass from the 13th century. A tapestry from the 15th century depicts the life of the martyrs Gervasius and Protasius, the patron saints of the cathedral. Rubens' Adoration of the Shepherds hangs in the northern transept, as does a painting by Philippe de Champaigne.

Maurice Duruflé composed his work for organ "Fugue sur  de la Cathédrale de Soissons" op. 12 (1962)

Some stained glass windows from the Cathedrale de Soissons are on permanent exhibit at the Walters Art Museum in Baltimore, Maryland, and the Isabella Stewart Gardner Museum in Boston.

2017 Storm Damage 
On January 12, 2017, during a winter storm, strong winds collapsed in a significant portion of the west rose window.  Large stone pieces of the window's tracery and sections of stained glass fell onto the tracker-action pipe organ located below the rose window, causing severe damage to the instrument.

Gallery

See also
List of Gothic Cathedrals in Europe

References

External links

 Photos
 360-degree panoramas

Churches completed in 1211
12th-century Roman Catholic church buildings in France
Roman Catholic cathedrals in France
Churches in Aisne
Basilica churches in France
Gothic architecture in France